Lanre Adesina Hassan  (born ), popularly called Iya Awero is a Nigerian film actress, who features majorly in the Yoruba-language cinema of Nollywood, although she features in English-language productions as well. Since the start of her career with the Ojo Ladipo Theatre Group, Iya Awero has starred in multiple films.

Early life 
Iya Awero was born in Lagos. She spends most of her early life in Lagos Island, Lagos state.

Career 
At the age of 14, Hassan joined the drama group Young Stars Concert Party alongside members like Ojo Ladipo (also known as Baba Mero) and Adebayo Salami. Later, they changed their name to Ojo Ladipo Theatre Group. She entered the Lagos School of Dramatic Arts in 1970 under the direction of one Chief Olude, a famous drama professor at the time, to give her performance an intellectual bite and flare. She then received straight admission to the Center for Cultural Studies at the University of Lagos, where she would study theater (diploma). However, she became pregnant and was unable to finish the program. Baba Mero passed away in 1978, and Adebayo Salami took over as leader of the newly renamed Awada Kerikeri (Oga Bello). After making her debut, Hassan

Education 
Iya Awero attended Oduwabore Memorial School, Mushin, Lagos. prior to acting, Iya Awero attended the school of drama for professional training.

Selected filmography

Ìlù Gángan
Iró Gunfun
Adelebo
Aje Metta
Baba Lukudi
Iyawo Tunde
Igba Ewa
Ìkúnlè Kèsán
Ìrírí Mi
Mama Lanre
Oníbárà
Àtànpàkò òtún
Ejide
Okun Emi
Oluweri Magboojo
Dokita Alabere
Fadùn Sáyémi
Ire Aye Mi
Eto Ikoko
Idajo Mi Tide
Ishola Oba-orin
Ogo-Nla
Sade Blade
Ògìdán
Ògo Idílé
Okun Ife
Orí
Owo Blow
Jawonbe
Ogbologbo
Ojabo Kofo
Pakúté Olórun
Boya Lemo
Back to Africa
Owo Blow: The Genesis
Aso Ásiri
Family on Fire
Omo Elemosho
Ayitale
Mama Insurance

See also
List of Yoruba people
List of Nigerian actors

References

External links

1950 births
Living people
Yoruba actresses
20th-century Nigerian actresses
21st-century Nigerian actresses
People from Lagos State
Actresses in Yoruba cinema
Nigerian film actresses
Nigerian television actresses
Yoruba-language names
University of Lagos alumni
People from Lagos
Residents of Lagos